NGC 6902 is an unbarred spiral galaxy located in the constellation of Sagittarius at an approximate distance of 131.80 Mly. NGC 6902 was discovered in 1836 by John Herschel.

See also
Galaxy

Gallery

References

External links

NGC 6902 on SIMBAD

6902
Discoveries by John Herschel
Astronomical objects discovered in 1836
Sagittarius (constellation)
Unbarred spiral galaxies